The Kiel Canal (literally "North-[to]-East [Baltic] Sea canal", formerly known as the ) is a  long freshwater canal in the German state of Schleswig-Holstein. The canal was finished in 1895, but later widened, and links the North Sea at Brunsbüttel to the Baltic Sea at Kiel-Holtenau. This not only saves time but also avoids storm-prone seas and having to pass through the Danish straits.

The Kiel Canal is the world's most frequented artificial waterway with an annual average of 32,000 ships (90 daily), transporting approximately 100 million tonnes of goods.

Besides its two sea entrances, the Kiel Canal is linked, at Oldenbüttel, to the navigable River Eider by the short Gieselau Canal.

History
The first connection between the North and Baltic Seas was constructed while the area was ruled by Denmark–Norway. It was called the Eider Canal and used stretches of the Eider River for the link between the two seas.

After 1864, the Second Schleswig War put Schleswig-Holstein under the government of Prussia (from 1871 the German Empire). A new canal was sought by merchants and by the German navy, which wanted to link its bases in the Baltic and the North Sea without the need to sail around Denmark.

Construction and expansion 
In June 1887, construction started at Holtenau, near Kiel. The canal took over 9,000 workers eight years to build. On 20 June 1895 Kaiser Wilhelm II officially opened the canal for transiting from Brunsbüttel to Holtenau. British director Birt Acres filmed the opening of the canal; the Science Museum in London preserves surviving footage of this early film. The first vessel to pass through the canal was the aviso , sent through in late April (before the canal officially opened) to determine if it was ready for use.

To cope with the increasing traffic and the demands of the Imperial German Navy, between 1907 and 1914 the canal was widened by Germany to allow  Dreadnought-sized battleships to pass through, allowing them to travel between the Baltic Sea and the North Sea without having to go around Denmark.  Two larger canal locks in Brunsbüttel and Holtenau were installed to complete the enlargement.

After World War I 
After World War I, the Treaty of Versailles required the canal to be open to vessels of commerce and of war of any nation at peace with Germany, while leaving it under German administration. (The United States opposed this proposal to avoid setting a precedent for similar concessions on the Panama Canal.) The government under Adolf Hitler repudiated its international status in 1936, but the canal was reopened to all traffic after World War II. In 1948, the current name was adopted.

The canal was partially closed for a period in March 2013 after two lock gates failed at the western end near Brunsbüttel. The failure was blamed on neglect and a lack of funding by the German Federal Government, which has been in financial dispute with the state of Schleswig-Holstein regarding the canal. Germany's Transport Ministry promised rapid repairs.

Operation
The canal is governed by detailed traffic rules. Each vessel using the canal is categorized into one of six traffic groups according to its dimensions. Larger ships are obliged to accept pilots and specialized canal helmsmen, in some cases even the assistance of a tugboat. Furthermore, there are regulations regarding the passing of oncoming ships. Larger ships may also be required to moor at the bollards provided at intervals along the canal to allow the passage of oncoming vessels. Special rules apply to pleasure craft.

The bulker Ever Leader (deadweight 74001 t) is considered to be the cargo ship that to date has come closest to the overall limits.

Crossings 

Several railway lines and federal roads (Autobahnen and Bundesstraßen) cross the canal on eleven fixed links. The oldest bridge still in use is the Levensau High Bridge from 1893; however, the bridge will be replaced in the course of a canal expansion already underway. In sequence and in the direction of the official kilometre count from west (Brunsbüttel) to east (Holtenau) these crossings are:
 Brunsbüttel High Bridge, four lane crossing of Bundesstraße 5
 Hochdonn High Bridge of the Marsh Railway
 Hohenhörn High Bridge for Autobahn 23
 Grünental High Bridge for railway line Neumünster-Heide and Bundesstraße 204
 Rendsburg High Bridge for the Neumünster–Flensburg railway, from which a transporter bridge, used by local traffic, is suspended
 Kanaltunnel Rendsburg, road tunnel for Bundesstraße 77 (four lanes)
 Rendsburg pedestrian tunnel 
 Rade High Bridge for Autobahn A7
 Levensau High Bridge from 1893 for the Kiel–Flensburg railway and a local road
 New Levensau High Bridge for Bundesstraße 76 (four lanes)
 Holtenau High Bridges, two parallel bridges with three car lanes each as well as pavements for pedestrians and cyclists

Local traffic is also served by 14 ferry lines. Most noteworthy is the “hanging ferry” (literally: "hovering ferry") that is hanging underneath the Rendsburg High Bridge.  However, this hanging ferry needs to be replaced after a collision with a ship in 2016. All ferries are run by the Canal Authority and their use is free of charge.

See also
 List of canals in Germany

References

External links

 Official site
 Time-lapse movie "Kiel-Canal Transit In 9 Minutes" released by UNITED CANAL AGENCY
 Movie about a container ship transiting the canal

 
Ship canals
Canal
Canals in Germany
Bodies of water of Schleswig-Holstein
Federal waterways in Germany
Canals opened in 1895
 
1895 establishments in Germany